Gnathophis nasutus (known commonly as the bignose conger) is an eel in the family Congridae (conger/garden eels). It was described by Emma Stanislavovna Karmovskaya and John Richard Paxton in 2000. It is a tropical, marine eel which is known from western Australia, in the eastern Indian Ocean. It dwells at a depth range of 80–140 metres.

References

nasutus
Taxa named by Emma Stanislavovna Karmovskaya
Taxa named by John Richard Paxton
Fish described in 2000